CStar is a private national French TV channel, owned by Canal+ Group.

History 
D17 was launched on 7 October 2012, replacing Direct Star, after Canal+ bought it to Bolloré Group.

D17 was rebranded CStar on 5 September 2016.

Since 27 February 2018, a sister channel named CStar Hits France is available exclusively on Canal+ channel 180, airing only French music clips.

Programmes 
Canal Star's programming has a musical format. The channel also airs documentaries, concerts, series, dramas, movies and Japanese anime.

Music Shows
 + 2 Music: short program. Presents an artist of the moment.
 Les Lives: concerts.
 Les Cérémonies: American music ceremonies like American Music Awards, Grammy Awards, Brit Awards.
 Nouvelle Star: Pop Idol adaption. Rebroadcasts from D8
 Nuit Electro A selection of electro music.
 Nuit Gold: A selection of clips of hits of the 1980s.
 Nuit Hip-Hop: A selection of hip-hop clips.
 Nuit Indé: A selection of indie music.
 Nuit Live A selection of music from around the world.
 Nuit Rap: A selection of raps.
 Nuit Rock: A selection of British, American, and French rock clips
 Star Story: Presented by Ayden. Documentary of the story of an artist or something related to music.
 Talent Tendance: short programme. Presents an artist at the moment.
 Top 80: playlist. Selection of clips from the 1980s.
 Top 90: playlist. Selection of clips from the 1990s.
 Top 2000: playlist. Selection of clips from the 2000s.
 Top Clip: playlist. Random clip broadcasting, usually from the 2000s & 2010's.
 Top Club: club music clip classification.
 Top D17: clip classification depending only from the editorial board.
 Top France: French-speaking and/or French singer clip classification.
 Top Hip-Hop: hip-hop music clip classification
 Top Rock: rock music clip classification.
 Virgin Radio Fans : live music show, presented by Cyril Hanouna and Énora Malagré.

Entertainment 
 À chacun son histoire… : replay of show of Karine Ferri, previously broadcast on Direct 8.
 Amazing Race: A race around the world, rebroadcasts of episodes from D8.
 Kaïra Shopping''': Web-series created by Franck Gastambide. With Abdelkrim, and Medi Moustène Sadoun.
 Les pires moments :  presented by Johann Lefèbvre and Gérard Baste
 Le Zap Le Zap Choc Show le Matin! 
 Pawn Stars R.I.P. (Recherches Investigations Paranormal) 
 Storage Wars The First 48 Ghost AdventuresD17 aired anime (One Piece, Fairy Tail, Saint Seiya Omega) until August 2015, when they were completely pulled off, replaced by Pawn Stars''.

See also
 Groupe Canal+
 Direct Star
 Canal 8

References

External links
  

Television stations in France
Television channels and stations established in 2012
French-language television stations
Canal+